Until Fear No Longer Defines Us is the third studio album of the Finnish doom metal band Ghost Brigade. The album peaked at No. 7 on the Finnish Albums Chart.

Track listing

Personnel

Band members
 Manne Ikonen - lead vocals
 Tommi Kiviniemi - guitar
 Wille Naukkarinen - guitar
 Veli-Matti Suihkonen - drums, percussion
 Janne Julin - bass

Guests 
 Aleksi Munter (Swallow the Sun) – keyboard

Production
 Antti Malinen - mixing, engineering, recording
 Jaakko Viitalähde - mastering
 Jussi Ratilainen - photography

References

2011 albums
Ghost Brigade (band) albums
Season of Mist albums